Gevalia is the largest coffee roastery in Scandinavia. In North America, the company sells coffee directly to consumers via home delivery and through big box stores such as Wal-Mart. Gevalia discontinued sales of tea in 2015.  Customers order from a customer service center and a website that was relaunched in August 2009. Gevalia is a wholly owned subsidiary of Kraft Heinz based in Chicago, Illinois, in North America and JDE Peet's in rest of the world. Gevalia produces more than 40 different varieties of coffee and tea.

Gevalia history
Located in Gävle, Sweden (Gevalia in Latin), Gevalia was introduced in 1853 in Sweden by the trading company Victor Theodore Engwall & Co KB. Jacob Engwall was CEO from 1963 to 1972. After 120 years as a family company, it was sold in 1971 to Mondelez International predecessor company, General Foods. Most Gevalia coffee is sold in Sweden, Denmark and in the Baltic area, but some is exported to America. Gevalia owes a large part of its current success in Northern Europe to a well-known and long-running marketing campaign with the theme of "unexpected visitors", starting in the early 1990s. The campaign featured in addition to print ads and movie commercials also installations in public places in Sweden featuring submarines and airplanes.

Gevalia began North American sales, via mail-order delivery service, in 1983. Gevalia is perhaps most well known for its introductory offer of a free coffeemaker and other coffee-related incentives. These offers were seen in magazine advertisements, direct mailings, and television commercials, but were later overtaken by online advertising. Some of these Gevalia.com advertisements were the basis of the 2005 Hypertouch based lawsuit. In September 2013, Gevalia Introduced specialty drink K-Cups using real milk.

In 2011, Kraft announced the retail launch of Gevalia in the United States; the in-store collection started with a complete line of ground, whole bean, decaf and flavored options.

After Kraft Foods Inc. was split into two companies in 2012, rights to Gevalia brands were divided and currently owned by Kraft Heinz in North America and JDE Peet's (formed from merger of Douwe Egberts and Mondelez International coffee and tea division) in rest of the world.

A mainstream supermarket brand in Northern Europe, Gevalia is marketed in the United States as a premium brand. Gevalia holds the royal warrant of appointment for coffee roasters from the King of Sweden. Gevalia also maintains an Office Coffee Service, offering mail-order coffee by the case, as well as coffee singles.

Gevalia is also sold for the Tassimo and K-Cup systems in the United States.

Coffees and teas
As of February 2007, Gevalia offered more than 40 different coffees and teas, according to Gevalia.com. The majority of these coffees are Arabica blends, using beans from Kenya, Guatemala, Colombia, and Costa Rica. Gevalia Kaffe is composed of up to six different varieties of these Arabica beans, as well as Brazilian beans, and those are having attention.

Controversies 
In 2005, Kraft was sued by Hypertouch, an ISP, for spamming its Gevalia coffee brand. Kraft was accused of sending multiple waves of junk advertisement to the ISP's customers, the action brought under the CAN-SPAM Act of 2003 act. The parties resolved their dispute by mutual agreement and the litigation has been dismissed.

On 9 February 2012, the T discs used in Gevalia, Maxwell House and Nabob brand espresso were recalled from the market following the potential of second degree burn hazard.

References

External links 
 

Coffee brands
Companies based in Gävleborg County
Purveyors to the Court of Sweden
Food and drink companies established in 1853
Kraft Foods brands
Food and drink companies of Sweden
Swedish companies established in 1853
JDE Peet's